Merrion Centre can refer to:

Merrion Centre, Dublin
Merrion Centre, Leeds